Abdirahman Ahmed Ali is a Somali politician, who is currently serving as the Governor of Awdal region of Somaliland since January 2018. In late January 2020, the religious leaders of the region accused him of insulting the religion (Islam), which is unlawful to the country's Law System, while the governor dismissed the allegations saying "I had no reason to insult the religion, since i am Muslim"

See also

 Governor of Awdal
 Awdal Region

References

Living people
Governors of Awdal
Year of birth missing (living people)